Patricia López Arnaiz (born 15 April 1981) is a Spanish actress, best known for her roles in 2020 drama film Ane Is Missing and television series A Different View.

Filmography

Film

Television

References

External links

Spanish film actresses
1981 births
Living people
People from Vitoria-Gasteiz
Best Actress Goya Award winners